Storm-petrel may refer to one of two bird families, both in the order Procellariiformes, once treated as the same family.

The two families are:
Northern storm petrels (Hydrobatidae) are found in the Northern Hemisphere, although some species around the Equator dip into the south.

Southern storm-petrels (Oceanitidae) are found in all oceans, although only white-faced storm petrel (breeding in the North Atlantic, in addition to the Southern Ocean) and Wilson's Storm-petrels (on migration) are found in the Northern Hemisphere.

Set index articles on animal common names